The 2014 Chinese Super League was the eleventh season since the establishment of the Chinese Super League, the 21st season of a professional Association football league and the 53rd top-tier league season in China. Guangzhou Evergrande won their fourth consecutive title of the league.

Promotion and relegation 
Teams promoted from 2013 China League One
 Henan Jianye 
 Harbin Yiteng

Teams relegated to 2014 China League One
 Qingdao Jonoon
 Wuhan Zall

Clubs

Clubs and locations

Managerial changes

Foreign players
The number of foreign players is restricted to five per CSL team, including a slot for a player from AFC countries. A team can use four foreign players on the field in each game, including at least one player from the AFC country. Players from Hong Kong, Macau and Chinese Taipei are deemed to be native players in CSL.

Players name in bold indicates the player is registered during the mid-season transfer window.

 Foreign players who left their clubs after first half of the season.

Hong Kong/Macau/Taiwan players (doesn't count on the foreign player slot)

League table

Results

Positions by round

Goalscorers

Top scorers
{| class="wikitable"
|-
!Rank
!Player
!Club
!Total
|-
!rowspan=1|
| Elkeson
|Guangzhou Evergrande
|
|-
!rowspan=1|
| Abderrazak Hamdallah
|Guangzhou R&F
|
|-
!rowspan=1|
| Tobias Hysen
|Shanghai East Asia
|
|-
!rowspan=1|
| Anselmo Ramon
|Hangzhou Greentown
|
|-
!rowspan=1|
| Dejan Damjanović
|Jiangsu Sainty/Beijing Guoan
|
|-
!rowspan=1|
| Davi
|Guangzhou R&F
|
|-
!rowspan=1|
| Vágner Love
|Shandong Luneng
|
|-
!rowspan=2|
| Bruno Meneghel
|Dalian Aerbin
|
|-
| Wu Lei
|Shanghai East Asia
|
|-
!rowspan=2|
| Dori
|Harbin Yiteng
|
|-
| James Chamanga
|Liaoning Whowin
|
|-

Hat-tricks

League attendance

†

†

Awards
 Chinese Football Association Footballer of the Year:  Elkeson (Guangzhou Evergrande)
 Chinese Super League Golden Boot Winner:  Elkeson (Guangzhou Evergrande)
 Chinese Super League Domestic Golden Boot Award:  Wu Lei (Shanghai SIPG)
 Chinese Football Association Goalkeeper of the Year:  Wang Dalei (Shandong Luneng Taishan)
 Chinese Football Association Young Player of the Year:  Liu Binbin (Shandong Luneng Taishan)
 Chinese Football Association Manager of the Year:  Gregorio Manzano (Beijing Guoan)
 Chinese Football Association Referee of the Year:  Tan Hai 
 Chinese Super League Fair Play Award: Henan Jianye, Hangzhou Greentown
 Chinese Super League Team of the Year (442):
GK  Wang Dalei (Shandong Luneng Taishan)
DF  Xu Yunlong (Beijing Guoan),  Kim Young-Gwon (Guangzhou Evergrande),  Zhang Linpeng (Guangzhou Evergrande),  Zheng Zheng (Shandong Luneng Taishan)
MF  Zhang Xizhe (Beijing Guoan),  Giovanni Moreno (Shanghai Shenhua),  Zheng Zhi (Guangzhou Evergrande),  Davi (Guangzhou R&F)
FW  Elkeson (Guangzhou Evergrande),  Wu Lei (Shanghai SIPG)

References

External links
Current CSL table, and recent results/fixtures at Soccerway
Chinese Super League official site 

Chinese Super League seasons
1
China
China